The 2019 Australian GT Championship is the 23rd running of the Australian GT Championship, a CAMS-sanctioned Australian motor racing championship open to FIA GT3 cars, FIA GT4 cars and similar cars as approved for the championship. The championship will commence on 14 March 2018 at the Melbourne Grand Prix Circuit and conclude on 10 November at Sandown Raceway. The championship will be contested over seven rounds. Each race, with the exception of the Australian Grand Prix round, will include at least one compulsory timed pit stop.

Race calendar
The 2019 calendar was unveiled on 20 October 2018

Entry List

Australian GT Championship

Australian Endurance Championship

Australian GT Trophy Series

Tropheo Challenge

Australian GT4 Championship

Race results
Bold indicates overall winner.

Championship Standings

Points system
Points were awarded as follows:

Australian GT Championship

Australian Endurance Championship

Australian GT4 Championship

Australian GT Trophy Series

Trofeo Challenge

Notes

References

Australian GT Championship
GT Championship

External links

Australian Endurance Championship